Hu Ze (born 7 September 1984) is a former Chinese short track speed skater. He is a champion and silver medallist of the 2007 Asian Winter Games. He briefly competed at the World Cup, achieving two personal podiums and one team victory during the 2006–07 season.

References

External links
 Profile in the ISU's database
 Profile at shorttrackonline.info

1984 births
Living people
Chinese male short track speed skaters
Asian Games medalists in short track speed skating
Short track speed skaters at the 2007 Asian Winter Games
Asian Games gold medalists for China
Asian Games silver medalists for China
Medalists at the 2007 Asian Winter Games
21st-century Chinese people